Konya Velodrome is an indoor velodrome or track cycling venue in Konya, Turkery. It is the country's first and the only modern velodrome.

The velodrome is located inside the Nation's Park in the Karahüyük neighborhood of Meram district of Konya, and is owned by the Metropolitan Municaplity in Konya. It has a seating capacity of 2,275. The velodrome is able is able to host international events.

Projected in 2019, the construction began with ground breaking in the beginning of 2021. The venue was opened on 5 August 2022 hosting the cycling events of the 2021 Islamic Solidarity Games held in Konya. It is Turkey's the first an only velodrome. meeting the modern standards.

References

Velodromes in Turkey
Sports venues in Konya
Indoor arenas in Turkey
Sports venues completed in 2022
2022 establishments in Turkey
Meram District